Route 24, also known as Dover Road and Murray Harbour Road, is a , two-lane, uncontrolled-access, secondary highway in Prince Edward Island. Its southern terminus is at Route 4 in Murray River and its northern terminus is at Route 3 in Vernon River. The route is in Kings and Queens counties.

Route description 

The route begins at its southern terminus and heads northwest, where it meets with Route 204 for a short east–west concurrency. It then crosses the county line between Kings and Queens counties, continues northwest, and ends at its northern terminus.

Junction list

References

024
024
024